Jive at Five is an album by trumpeter Joe Newman featuring tracks recorded with members of the Count Basie Orchestra in 1960 and originally released on the Swingville label.

Reception

AllMusic awarded the album 4 stars stating "Newman and his friends swing their way through four vintage standards and a couple of the leader's original blues in typical fashion".

Track listing
All compositions by Joe Newman except where noted
 "Wednesday's Blues" - 9:05 
 "Jive at Five" (Count Basie, Harry Edison) - 5:35
 "More Than You Know" (Vincent Youmans, Edward Eliscu, Billy Rose) - 3:59
 "Cuein' the Blues" - 4:33
 "Taps Miller" (Basie, Luis Russell) - 8:18
 "Don't Worry 'bout Me" (Rube Bloom, Ted Koehler) - 4:39

Personnel 
Joe Newman - trumpet
Frank Wess - tenor saxophone, flute
Tommy Flanagan - piano
Eddie Jones - bass
Oliver Jackson - drums

References 

1960 albums
Joe Newman (trumpeter) albums
Swingville Records albums
Albums produced by Norman Granz
Albums recorded at Van Gelder Studio